Helmut Stein (born November 9, 1942) is a German former footballer.

Stein played for the East Germany national team between 1962 and 1973.

In the East German top-flight he appeared for Hallescher FC Chemie (1961 - 1966) and FC Carl Zeiss Jena (1966 - 1976).

External links
 Profile at Carl Zeiss Jena wiki

References 

1942 births
Living people
German footballers
East German footballers
East Germany international footballers
Association football forwards
Hallescher FC players
FC Carl Zeiss Jena players
DDR-Oberliga players
People from Aschersleben
Footballers from Saxony-Anhalt